Pulau Senang is an  coral-formed island in the Republic of Singapore, located about  off the southern coast of the main island of Singapore. Along with Pulau Pawai to the northwest and Pulau Sudong further behind Pulau Pawai, it is used as a military training area for live-fire exercises carried out by the Singapore Armed Forces (SAF).

Pulau Senang is best known in the history of Singapore as the location of a former experimental offshore penal settlement that failed after only three years when an infamous riot against the small unit of prison authority (no more than 10) broke out in 1963, resulting in the death of four officers, including the overall prison-chief.

Etymology
In Malay, Pulau Senang literally translates as the "Island of Ease".

Prison riot

In 1960, an experimental-type offshore penal colony was established on Pulau Senang by the Singapore government. On the island, the prisoners, predominantly gangsters, were allowed to roam freely and were put to manual labour. It was envisioned that these hardened detainees could be reformed through hard work and be sent back home with an ability to seek employment afterwards.

The prison-settlement was started on 18 May in 1960, when 50 detainees, sent from Changi Prison, arrived with Irish-born Prisons Superintendent Daniel Dutton, the appointed chief of the penal settlement. Over the next three years, the number of detainees from the mainland rose to 320 and together they transformed the island into an attractive settlement, albeit one for criminals still.

However, a riot broke out three years after the island prison was first established, resulting in four deaths of prison officers, including Dutton. 18 men were convicted of murder and hanged. In the aftermath, the penal settlement was shut down in 1964.

Restricted Area
Since 9 June 1989, the island, together with Pulau Pawai and Pulau Sudong, form the Singapore Armed Forces (SAF) Southern Islands Live-Firing Area (SILFA), a restricted military training area and live-firing zone. As with all other military areas, installations and zones within the country, the entire live-firing zone is strictly off-limits to all civilians and unauthorised vessels at all times of the day and the night. In SILFA, the Republic of Singapore Air Force (RSAF) conducts military exercises for aerial bombing and parachute/rappelling practices, and on Pulau Sudong, there is a runway and a small control-tower for (military) planes to land and takeoff before flying off to the nearby Pulau Pawai, on where a series of artificial ground-targets are located, for bombing exercises. While not often, the Republic of Singapore Navy (RSN) occasionally uses SILFA for naval gunnery drills and exercises.

Panorama

References

Victor R Savage, Brenda S A Yeoh (2004), Toponymics - A Study of Singapore Street Names, Eastern University Press, 
Tommy Koh et al. (2006), Singapore: The Encyclopedia, Editions Didier Millet and National Heritage Board,

External links
Coral reefs of Singapore - Live-firing islands
"Dolphins spotted off Pulau Senang" at habitatnews
Satellite image of Pulau Senang - Google Maps

Senang
Western Islands Planning Area